Sartaveh-ye Kabitollah (also Romanized as Sartāveh-ye Kābītollah; also known as Sartāveh) is a village in Poshteh-ye Zilayi Rural District, Sarfaryab District, Charam County, Kohgiluyeh and Boyer-Ahmad Province, Iran. At the 2006 census, its population was 19, in 5 families.

References 

Populated places in Charam County